Bank Street Writer is a word processor for the Apple II, Atari 8-bit family, Commodore 64, MSX, Macintosh, IBM PC, and IBM PCjr computers. It was designed in 1981 by a team of educators at the Bank Street College of Education in New York City, software developer Franklin E. Smith, and programmers at Intentional Educations in Watertown, Massachusetts. The software was sold in two versions: one for elementary school students published by Scholastic and a general version from Broderbund.

History
Prior to the advent of the Bank Street Writer, most word processors ran on networked minicomputers. The most popular word processor for the personal computer was Apple Writer, which (prior to the version II release) operated in Apple's text mode where all text consisted of uppercase letters. Apple Writer used a black-on-white character to represent an actual capital letter. Microcomputer word processors of the early 1980s typically had no menus; so to perform basic functions such as copying and pasting, a writer had to type a series of keystrokes. The Bank Street Writer operated in graphics mode, where characters were displayed normally with lower and upper case letters, and it provided helpful prompts during editing.

The Bank Street Writer was initially designed for use in schools. The name was a modern-day reference to the Bank Street Readers, a widely respected early learning book series created in the 1960s by Bank Street College. The school version of the Bank Street Writer was published by Scholastic Inc. and included a series of workbooks and other teacher and student materials. The Bank Street Writer became the leading word processor used in elementary schools throughout most of the 1980s. During this period, Bank Street College, led by its president, Richard Ruopp, did pioneering work in the use of technology in elementary schools. Among the results were the Bank Street Writer and The Voyage of the Mimi, a groundbreaking science-based TV series.

The interface contains menus listing the operations the word processor can perform, such as "cut" and "paste", and brief directions for how to perform each function. The design addressed the need for a word processor that would enable elementary school children to use a computer to write stories and essays. Bank Street Writer is a modal editor - pressing the Esc key toggled between editing mode and menu mode.

Broderbund published a successful home version of the Bank Street Writer, which did not contain the additional school materials and was published as a retail software product. The Bank Street Writer was for several years the best-selling product in the "home software" category on what was then the most respected sales chart in the industry - the Softsel Hot List, from Softsel Distributing of Inglewood, California.

Reception
II Computing listed Bank Street Writer eighth on the magazine's list of top Apple II non-game, non-educational software as of late 1985, based on sales and market-share data.

At its introduction, the program was the subject of a laudatory story in Time about how the Bank Street Writer ("BSW") was introducing word processing into the classroom. From the article: "Children who once struggled to write two-page stories are churning out five pages or more." and "Most important, the children cheerfully tackle the messy business of revision." The article concluded: "Judging from recent sales, however, a good proportion of BSW users are adults. Designing a program for children, the Bank Street team inadvertently responded to a challenge the entire software industry faces: making computers accessible to people who do not understand machines and do not want to read manuals."

ANALOG Computing stated that Bank Street Writer was suited for home users wanting to write letters and school reports, albeit lacking footnotes. The author criticized the slow speed of the word processor for documents of three or more pages, reporting that he gave up on using it to write the review, but concluded that "in spite of its shortcomings, BSW is the easiest word processor program" for Atari 8-bit computers and that it "has almost everything going for it—it is up to the user to decide if it goes far enough". Antic wrote, "The Bank Street Writer was designed for use at home by the family, and for those whose writing needs are on a small scale. This is a really good first word processor - for someone new to the Atari." Byte said that it was "a good word processor, but it has limited uses". While approving of its ease of use, the magazine criticized its 38x18 screen as "simply too small to display any but the simplest documents". Compute! said of an updated version, "There will probably never be a perfect word processor ... but Bank Street Writer Plus brings us a little closer to the unattainable." InfoWorld praised the software's ease of use, stating that they used their review copy for 2 hours before opening the manual. PC Magazine criticized BSW's user friendly approach of only offering one way to access functionality as limiting for more experienced users, saying there should be a way to bypass the menus.

See also
Bank Street Music Writer

References

External links
 Popular Apple II software of 1983
 Other Bank Street Software Titles

1981 software
Word processors
Apple II word processors
Atari 8-bit family software
Commodore 64 software